is a Japanese former professional baseball outfielder in Nippon Professional Baseball. He played for the Yomiuri Giants from 1965 to 1977.

References

1944 births
Living people
Chuo University alumni
Baseball people from Kumamoto Prefecture
People from Hitoyoshi, Kumamoto
Japanese baseball players
Yomiuri Giants players
Nippon Professional Baseball outfielders
Japanese baseball coaches
Nippon Professional Baseball coaches